Anne Pierson Wiese (born 1964 Minneapolis, Minnesota ), is an American poet.

Life
Anne Pierson Wiese grew up in Brooklyn, New York. She is a graduate of Amherst College and New York University.  Currently she works and lives in South Dakota with her husband, the writer Ben Miller.

Wiese's work has appeared in: The Nation, Prairie Schooner, Ploughshares, New England Review, Virginia Quarterly Review, Raritan, Antioch Review, Southwest Review, Alaska Quarterly Review, Hudson Review, Literary Imagination, Carolina Quarterly, Malahat Review, Ecotone, Hopkins Review, and many other journals.

Awards and honors
 2019 Amy Lowell Traveling Poetry Scholarship
 2018 Fellowship in Poetry from the South Dakota Arts Council
 2006 Walt Whitman Award
 2005 Fellowship in Poetry from the New York Foundation for the Arts
 2004 Second Prize in the Arvon International Poetry Competition sponsored by the Arvon Foundation in Great Britain
 2004 "Discovery"/The Nation Poetry Contest 
 2002 First Place Poetry Prize in the Writers@Work Fellowship Competition.

Works

Poetry Books

Plays
  (produced 1982)

Anthologies

References

1964 births
Living people
Writers from Minneapolis
Writers from New York City
Amherst College alumni
New York University alumni
American women poets
21st-century American poets
21st-century American women writers